Norstictic acid is a depsidone produced as a secondary metabolites in lichens.

References

Lactones
Phenols
Lichen products
Heterocyclic compounds with 4 rings